Barmy Aunt Boomerang is a children's comedy television series broadcast on BBC1 in the United Kingdom from 16 September 1999 to 21 December 2000. Sebastian's world is turned upside down by the arrival of his unconventional Australian aunt Boomerang. It is revealed in the first episode that Aunt Boomerang is in fact a ghost who was starring in an Australian soap when she was killed on set. She now acts as something of a "fairy godmother" to Sebastian. The show ran for two series.

Alex Harvey (born October 1959), the son of the Scottish musician of the same name, played the part of police sergeant Keen.

Series guide 
 Series 1 - 15 episodes broadcast 16 September 1999 – 23 December 1999
 Series 2 - 15 episodes broadcast 14 September 2000 – 21 December 2000
(Source : BBC Motion Gallery)

Cast 
Toyah Willcox as Aunt Boomerang
Kern Falconer as Mr Diplock
Terry Neason as Mrs Belcher
Laura McKenzie as Meryl
Lawrie McNicol as Kevin Simpkins
Richard Madden as Sebastian Simpkins
Sharon MacKenzie as Tracey Simpkins
Alex Harvey as Sergeant Keen
Blaine Slater as Ashley

Ratings (CBBC Channel)
Saturday 29 June 2002- 40,000 (2nd most watched on CBBC that week)

References

External links

1999 British television series debuts
2000 British television series endings
BBC children's television shows
British children's comedy television series
Fictional Australian people
English-language television shows